The following is the List of massacres in Ottoman Syria, mass atrocities committed during the Ottoman rule in Syrian provinces (region roughly corresponding the Levant) between 1517 and 1918.
 For massacres that took place in Roman Judea, see List of massacres in Roman Judea
 For massacres that took place in the Mandatory Palestine, see List of killings and massacres in Mandatory Palestine.
 For massacres that took place in modern Syria, see List of massacres in Syria.
 For massacres that took place during the 1948 Palestine War, see Killings and massacres during the 1948 Palestine War. 
 For massacres that have occurred in Israel following its declaration of independence, see List of massacres in Israel.
 For massacres that have occurred in the West Bank and the Gaza Strip since 1967, see List of massacres in Palestinian Territories.
 For massacres that have occurred during the Syrian Civil War since 2011, see List of massacres during the Syrian Civil War.

See also
 List of massacres in Syria

References

Ottoman Syria
Ottoman Syria